Mount Tukotok is a red granite peak, 2,540 m, standing 5 nautical miles (9 km) east-southeast of Mount Apolotok in Salamander Range, Freyberg Mountains. Named by the Northern Party of New Zealand Geological Survey Antarctic Expedition (NZGSAE), 1963–64; the name is of Eskimo origin and means "the little red one."

Mountains of Victoria Land
Pennell Coast